Normacot is an area of Longton, Stoke-on-Trent, in the county of Staffordshire, England. 
Notable buildings include the church of the Holy Evangelists by Scott.

The district used to be served by Normacot railway station, but although the Crewe–Derby line is still open, the station was closed in 1964.

References

Areas of Stoke-on-Trent